Javier Horacio Pinola (born 24 February 1983) is an Argentine former professional footballer who played  as a left-back. He started his career with Chacarita Juniors in 2000, but spent most of his professional career with Nürnberg, appearing in 286 competitive games and winning the 2007 German Cup.

Club career

Born in Olivos, Buenos Aires Province, Pinola began playing as a senior with Chacarita Juniors in the Argentine Primera División. Two years later he moved to Spain and Atlético Madrid, going on to appear mainly for the reserves and also being loaned two times for the duration of his contract, mainly to Germany's 1. FC Nürnberg.

After solid displays in his first two seasons in the Bundesliga, adding the conquest of the German Cup in his second, to which he contributed with two goals and two assists in six games, Pinola joined Nürnberg on a permanent basis. He played 19 matches in his first year in his second spell, suffering team relegation.

Pinola continued to be a defensive mainstay for the Franconians in the following campaigns, renewing his contract first until 2013 then 2015 but leaving eventually at the end of 2014–15 after rejecting a new offer.

On 24 June 2015, Pinola was presented as a new player of Rosario Central, joining after being convinced by manager Eduardo Coudet.

International career
In 2007, Pinola was selected by Argentina manager Alfio Basile for friendlies with Switzerland and Algeria. He earned his first cap against the latter, on 5 June.

In 2016, following a string of good performances, head coach Gerardo Martino called up Pinola for 2018 World Cup qualifiers against Chile and Bolivia. He played the full 90 minutes against the former, in a 2–0 win in Córdoba.

Career statistics

Honours
Nürnberg
 DFB-Pokal: 2006–07

River Plate
 Argentine Primera División: 2021
Copa Argentina: 2016–17, 2018-19
 Supercopa Argentina: 2017, 2019
Trofeo de Campeones: 2021
 Copa Libertadores: 2018
 Recopa Sudamericana: 2019

Argentina U20
 South American Youth Football Championship: 2003

References

External links
 
 
 

1983 births
Living people
People from Vicente López Partido
Argentine footballers
Association football defenders
Argentine Primera División players
Chacarita Juniors footballers
Racing Club de Avellaneda footballers
Rosario Central footballers
Club Atlético River Plate footballers
La Liga players
Segunda División B players
Atlético Madrid B players
Atlético Madrid footballers
Bundesliga players
2. Bundesliga players
1. FC Nürnberg players
Copa Libertadores-winning players
Argentina under-20 international footballers
Argentina international footballers
Argentine expatriate footballers
Expatriate footballers in Spain
Expatriate footballers in Germany
Argentine expatriate sportspeople in Spain
Argentine expatriate sportspeople in Germany
Sportspeople from Buenos Aires Province
Argentine people of Finnish descent